Donald Grey Barnhouse (March 28, 1895 – November 5, 1960), was an American Christian preacher, pastor, theologian, radio pioneer, and writer. He was pastor of the Tenth Presbyterian Church in Philadelphia, Pennsylvania from 1927 to his death in 1960. As a pioneer in radio broadcasting, his program, The Bible Study Hour, continues today and is now known as Dr. Barnhouse & the Bible.

Career
Barnhouse pastored the Tenth Presbyterian Church in Philadelphia, Pennsylvania from 1927 until his death in 1960.

He was a pioneer in preaching over the radio; his program was known as The Bible Study Hour. His broadcasts were taped, and today the program continues to air as Dr. Barnhouse & the Bible. In 1949, he began a weekly, in-depth study of the Book of Romans on his program, which lasted until his death in 1960. He also wrote many articles and books. For many years, Barnhouse held a Bible class on Monday evenings at St. Luke's Lutheran Church near Times Square in Manhattan, which lasted until his death.

In 1931, Barnhouse began publishing Revelation, a magazine which published his sermons, expositions, and religious interpretations of current events. Revelation was published until 1950.  Barnhouse also founded Eternity magazine in 1950 and was editor-in-chief of the monthly publication. He wrote a "Window on the World" column for each issue between 1931 and 1960 and discussed contemporary concerns from a biblical perspective. In September 1956, Eternity magazine published his article, "Are the Seventh-day Adventists Christians?"  He answered affirmatively, but in the past, he had excluded them for some of their teachings.

The article was described as a "blockbuster" by his wife, Margaret Barnhouse, in her biography, That Man Barnhouse (1983). She wrote that the "reaction was immediate: outraged canceling of subscriptions or grateful commendation because [he] had the courage to... admit he had been wrong in the past about the Adventists." Along with fellow evangelical Walter Martin, Barnhouse argued that the "Adventists hold all the basic doctrines of Christianity" with some heterodox teachings. Eternity published a cover story and memorial issue tribute to Barnhouse shortly after his death.

C. Everett Koop, the former U.S. Surgeon General, attended the Tenth Presbyterian Church for more than twenty years. He said of Barnhouse: 
"His authoritative voice held my attention, his physical appearance was arresting, and his preaching was teaching of the highest intellectual order ... I always marveled at the simplicity of the faith of this very intelligent and learned man."

Personal life
Barnhouse was born March 28, 1895, in Watsonville, California. His parents were Theodore and Jennie Carmichael Barnhouse. After graduating high school, he enrolled at the Biola Institute, in 1912. He also studied at the University of Chicago and Princeton Theological Seminary. He enlisted in the army in 1917 before completing his studies at Princeton. First Lieutenant Barnhouse of the Aviation Section of the Signal Corps was ordained in April 1918 by the Presbyterian Church in the U.S.A.

Barnhouse married Ruth, and they had four children: sons Donald Jr. and David, and daughters Ruth and Dorothy. Wife Ruth died of cancer in 1944.

Several years later, he married his second wife Margaret (née Nuckols) Bell, the widow of Douglas Bell. They made their home on an  farm near Doylestown, Pennsylvania. Donald Grey Barnhouse died in a Philadelphia hospital one month after being diagnosed with a large, malignant brain tumor.

Works
Many of the books authored by Donald Grey Barnhouse have been re-published since his death, some in their tenth or more printing. Some of his works include:
 Acts (1979), Zondervan
 Bible Truth Illustrated (1979), Keats
 The Cross Through the Open Tomb (1961), Eerdmans Publishing
 Genesis (1970), Zondervan, 2 vols.
 God's Methods for Holy Living (1949), Revelation Publications
 Guaranteed Deposits (1949), Revelation Publications
 The Invisible War (1965), Zondervan
 Let Me Illustrate (1967), Revell
 Revelation (1971), Zondervan
 Romans (1982), Eerdmans Publishing, 4 vols.
 Teaching the Word of Truth (1940), Eerdmans Publishing
 Thessalonians (1977), Zondervan
 Words Fitly Spoken (1969), Tyndale House Publishers
 Your Right to Heaven (1977), Baker Book House

Archives
The Presbyterian Historical Society in Philadelphia, Pennsylvania, has a large collection of Barnhouse’s papers including correspondence, photographs and audio records documenting his personal and professional life. The collection includes materials from his media ventures including his broadcasts and the magazines Revelation and Eternity. The material includes sermons, radio scripts, correspondences, articles, and a diary of his personal life. The Barnhouse collection also includes photographs that depict his family, friends, ministry and travels.

References

External links

Dr. Barnhouse & the Bible
Dr. Barnhouse & the Bible on OnePlace 
 

1895 births
1960 deaths
20th-century American male writers
20th-century Calvinist and Reformed theologians
20th-century Presbyterian ministers
American Calvinist and Reformed theologians
American evangelicals
American Presbyterian ministers
American radio personalities
Biola University alumni
Burials in Pennsylvania
Clergy from Philadelphia
People from Watsonville, California
Presbyterian writers
Princeton Theological Seminary alumni
University of Chicago alumni